Reza Aliari is an Iranian football defender, who plays for Saipa  in the Persian Gulf Pro League.

Career

Early years
He started his career with Shahrdari Ghods. He also played at Rah Ahan youth levels. Later he joined Moghavemat Tehran U21 and helped them to become champions in the 2013–14 U-21 Tehran Asia Vision Premier League.

Naft Tehran
He joined Naft Tehran on May 26, 2014, with a three-year contract. He made his debut against Naft MIS on September 20, 2014, as a substitute for Kamal Kamyabinia and scored 3 minutes after his entrance.

Saipa 
In May 2017, he joined Saipa and played under Ali Daei for the season.

Club career statistics

References

External links
 Reza Aliari at IranLeague.ir
 Reza Aliari at Footballtehran.com

1994 births
Living people
Iranian footballers
Association football defenders
Association football wingers
Naft Tehran F.C. players
People from Tehran Province
Nassaji Mazandaran players